Lostwithiel was a rotten borough in Cornwall which returned two Members of Parliament to the House of Commons in the English and later British Parliament from 1304 to 1832, when it was abolished by the Great Reform Act.

History
The borough consisted of the town of Lostwithiel and part of the neighbouring Lanlivery parish; it was a market town whose trade was mainly dependent on the copper mined nearby.

Unlike many of the most notorious Cornish rotten boroughs, Lostwithiel had been continuously represented since the Middle Ages and was originally of sufficient size to justify its status. However, by the time of the Great Reform Act it had long been a pocket borough, under the complete control of the Earls of Mount Edgcumbe since 1702. The right to vote was vested in the corporation, who numbered 24 in 1816; they made no attempt to defy their patron, who regularly paid the corporation's debts and advanced them money.

In 1831, the borough had a population of 1,047, and 303 houses.

Members of Parliament

1304–1629
 Constituency created (1304)

1640–1832

Notes

References
Robert Beatson, "A Chronological Register of Both Houses of Parliament" (London: Longman, Hurst, Res & Orme, 1807) 
D Brunton & D H Pennington, Members of the Long Parliament (London: George Allen & Unwin, 1954)
Cobbett's Parliamentary history of England, from the Norman Conquest in 1066 to the year 1803 (London: Thomas Hansard, 1808) 
 Maija Jansson (ed.), Proceedings in Parliament, 1614 (House of Commons) (Philadelphia: American Philosophical Society, 1988) 
J Holladay Philbin, "Parliamentary Representation 1832 – England and Wales" (New Haven: Yale University Press, 1965)
Henry Stooks Smith, "The Parliaments of England from 1715 to 1847" (2nd edition, edited by FWS Craig – Chichester: Parliamentary Reference Publications, 1973)
 

Parliamentary constituencies in Cornwall (historic)
Constituencies of the Parliament of the United Kingdom established in 1304
Constituencies of the Parliament of the United Kingdom disestablished in 1832
Rotten boroughs
Lostwithiel